The Commerce Journal is a weekly online Burmese language newspaper published every Monday by the Ministry of Commerce in Burma.

See also
List of newspapers in Burma

Notes

Weekly newspapers published in Myanmar